Frontline AIDS (formerly known as the International HIV/AIDS Alliance (IHAA) until 2019) is a global partnership of nationally based governmental and non-governmental organizations which support community organizations which promote HIV/AIDS issues in developing countries. The Alliance was created in November 1993 as the International Alliance Supporting Community Action on AIDS, and later renamed the International HIV/AIDS Alliance. In 2019, they rebranded themselves as Frontline AIDS. The alliance's founding executive director, Jeffrey O'Malley, served from 1993 to 2003.  From 2003 until 2015, the alliance was led by Alvaro Bermejo, who was succeeded by Christine Stegling.

See also
 Action for Global Health
 India HIV/AIDS Alliance
 List of non-governmental organizations in China
 Seth Berkley
 Source (International Information Support Centre)
 Starfish Greathearts Foundation

References

Sources
Books

 
 
 
 
 
 

Journals and magazines

External links

 
 International HIV/AIDS Alliance articles at Google Scholar

Organizations established in 1993
HIV/AIDS research organisations
HIV/AIDS organisations in the United Kingdom